This is a list of bishops of the Methodist Church in Singapore, in order of their election to the episcopacy, both living and dead.

Elected by General Conference, U.S.A. to superintend Methodist work in Southern and Southeast Asia
 James M Thoburn (1888–1904)
 Frank W Warne [assisting James M Thoburn] (1900–1904)
 William F Oldham (1904–1912)
 John E Robinson (1912–1914)
 William P Eveland (1914–1916)
 [No Resident Bishop - Episcopal duties covered by Bishops John E Robinson and JW Robinson] (1916–1920)
 George H Bickley (1920–1924)
 Titus Lowe (1924–1928)
 Edwin F Lee (1928–1948)
 [No Resident Bishop - Episcopal duties covered by Bishops Ralph Cushman and Arthur J Moore] (1948–1950)

Elected by Southeastern Asia Central Conference
 Raymond L Archer (1950–1956)
 Hobart B Amstutz (1956–1964)
 Robert F Lundy (1964–1968)

Elected by The Methodist Church in Malaysia and Singapore
 Yap Kim Hao (1968–1973)
 Theodore R Doraisamy (1973–1976)

Elected by The Methodist Church in Singapore
 Kao Jih Chung (1976–1984)
 Ho Chee Sin (1984–1996)
 Wong Kiam Thau (1996–2000)
 Robert M Solomon (2000–2012)
 Wee Boon Hup (2012–2016)
 Chong Chin Chung (2016–2020)
 Gordon Wong Cheong Weng (2020-)

References

Methodism in Singapore
Lists of Protestant bishops and archbishops
Bishops in Singapore
Methodist bishops
Bishops
Bishops